Kandawo, also known as Narake (but see related Narak) is a Trans–New Guinea language of Western Highlands Province, Papua New Guinea. A dialect survey of Kandawo has been conducted by Graham (1998).

References

Languages of Western Highlands Province
Chimbu–Wahgi languages